Francis Hopkinson School is a historic elementary school located in the Juniata neighborhood of Philadelphia, Pennsylvania. It is part of the School District of Philadelphia. The building was designed by Irwin T. Catharine and built in 1926–1927. It is a three-story, eight-bay, yellow brick building on a raised basement in the Art Deco style. It features an arched entryway with terra cotta trim and pilasters, a terra cotta cornice, and brick parapet. The school is named for Francis Hopkinson.

The building was added to the National Register of Historic Places in 1988.

References

External links

School buildings on the National Register of Historic Places in Philadelphia
Art Deco architecture in Pennsylvania
School buildings completed in 1927
Northeast Philadelphia
Public K–8 schools in Philadelphia
School District of Philadelphia
1927 establishments in Pennsylvania